The 2000 New Zealand rugby union tour of Japan and Europe was a series of matches played in November 2000 in Japan and Europe by New Zealand national rugby union team.

It was a double tour because, while the All Blacks, the "New Zealand A" (at those time not called as "Junior All Blacks", name used for Under 23 side) toured also.

All Blacks Tour 

Scores and results list New Zealand's points tally first.

"A" team tour 
Scores and results list New Zealand's points tally first.

References

External links
2000 New Zealand rugby union tour of France and Italy at ESPN

2000 rugby union tours
2000 in New Zealand rugby union
2000
2000–01 in French rugby union
2000–01 in Italian rugby union
2000–01 in Welsh rugby union
2000–01 in Japanese rugby union
2000–01 in Romanian rugby union
2000–01 in European rugby union
2000
2000
2000
2000
2000